Borregos Salvajes México is a college American football team that represents the Monterrey Institute of Technology and Higher Education, Campus State of Mexico.

Unlike traditional teams such as Pumas Dorados de la UNAM, Aguilas Blancas or Borregos Salvajes (Monterrey), Borregos Salvajes-CEM is a younger program tracing is roots to the late-1970s.  Nonetheless, it has recently experienced success on the playing field having won two national championships in 2000 and 2003.
With the expansion of the private education system of the ITESM, founded some alternative campus outside its home city of Monterrey, one of those campus were the Campus Estado de México. Then the origins of the team are the late-1970s when the Campus Estado de México was founded and built in Atizapán de Zaragoza in the State of Mexico. The only buildings were the so-called "Torre Central", Aulas I, the Cafeteria, the gym and the athletics and football court.

At the beginning the team developed only minor categories (Juvenil) and didn't appear in the most important competition (Liga Mayor), during the period from the creation until 1985 the team suffered and had lows and highs.

At the end of the 1980s the team entered the Liga Mayor at the Conferencia Nacional, where got the championship and get the right to access the Conferencia Metropolitana.

The team achieved championships in 2000 and 2003, defeating the Borregos Salvajes-Mty.
Nowadays, the team has grown very powerful, and is sometimes considered the second best team in the league.

The stadium where the team plays as a host team is the Estadio TEC CEM, frequently called the "Plastic Corral".

American football teams in Mexico
Monterrey Institute of Technology and Higher Education
1970s establishments in Mexico
Sports clubs established in the 1970s